Frank Esports is a Hong Kong-based professional League of Legends team competing in the Pacific Championship Series (PCS), the top-level league for the game in Taiwan, Hong Kong, Macau, and Southeast Asia.

History

Founding 
Frank Esports was founded on 27 January 2022, when its owners acquired a spot in the Pacific Championship Series. It fielded an all-Hong Kong roster in its inaugural season: top laner Tsang "Kirt" Ka-kit, jungler Tsang "Holo" Tak-lam, mid laner Jason "Pretender" Ng Cheuk-lun, bot laner Wong "MnM" Ka-chun, and supports Law "Keres" Chi-kit and Fu "Rebirth" Chun-kit. Pretender was loaned to Frank Esports by fellow Hong Kong team PSG Talon shortly after he joined the latter.

2022 season 

Frank Esports finished seventh in the spring regular season and qualified for the first round of playoffs in the losers' bracket. After sweeping sixth-place Meta Falcon Team in the first round, Frank Esports were themselves swept by fourth-place Deep Cross Gaming (DCG) in the second round and eliminated from the playoffs of their inaugural season.

Improving from their inaugural split, Frank Esports finished the summer regular season tied for fourth with CTBC Flying Oyster (CFO). Unfortunately for Frank Esports, they were defeated in a tiebreaker match against CFO and finished fifth overall in the regular season. This qualified Frank Esports for the first round of the winners' bracket of playoffs, albeit without side selection against their opponent, which was once again CFO. The team lost their series against CFO and dropped to the losers' bracket, where they defeated Impunity Esports before falling to DCG, ending their playoffs run.

Current roster

References

External links 
 

Esports teams based in Hong Kong
Pacific Championship Series teams